Hardwell On Air (abbreviated HOA) is the name of a weekly radio show created and hosted by Dutch DJ and record producer Hardwell. Since 4 March 2011, the program has been broadcast live on Fridays from 11:00 p.m. to 00:00 via Hardwell's official YouTube and Facebook profile. A number of Internet and FM radio stations broadcast the podcast in their program as well. During the show, he presents new productions in a one-hour set. According to his own statement the tracks embody the genres electro-, progressive- and tech-house. Since quite some time, the episodes are finished with a hardstyle track and even during the set there are several deviations from the genres. All episodes are offered as free download on iTunes in the category "Podcasts".

The last 500th episode was broadcast on 15 January 2021. Its follow up was a new show called Revealed Selected, hosted by Adam K of Tomorrowland's One World Radio.

Concept 
The sets have a length of one hour and are initiated with a vocal short. This consists of a distorted voice, which introduces each episode with the same word sequence: "Are we on Air? Welcome to the soundtrack of your nightlife. One hour of the present and future. Tune in, to Hardwell on air". The soundtrack of the intro consists of the song "Encoded" by Hardwell himself, released in the year 2011. A follow-up statement from Hardwell can be heard. Usually follows this one or more smoother songs. The following categories are processed in each episode:
 Hardwell Exclusive: One or more songs that will be released on "Revealed Recordings" and / or were produced by Hardwell himself.
 Track of the Week: A newly released song, which convinces by high quality and / or other factors.
 Demo of the Week: A demotrack that was sent to Hardwell or the label.
Demo of the Week was then replaced with three Community Picks which are tracks sent to the label and then released under the sub-label Revealed Radar.

After the different categories have been dealt with, the music style is mostly changed to hardstyle or future-bass, whereupon the episode experiences a back-announcement by Hardwell. For many songs, a shout or tag is added, which refers to the podcast, to protect the song from being used before the release is done. Regarding to this, in early 2017 a video came to the Internet, which shows Korean comedian and DJ G-Park and DJ Charles playing Jewelz & Sparks's "Grande Opera". During the break Hardwell can be heard presenting the track as well as the "Hardwell On Air tag" just before the drop starts. This indicated that the duo recorded the track from the podcast and did not get it legally. As a running gag, the duo played the track in combination with the "Hardwell On Air tag" since then.

On June 14, 2017, Jewelz & Sparks playing their track "Grande Opera" with Hardwell On Air sample again in Ultra Music Festival Korea, also posted in Facebook.

Channels 

 Radio FG Belgique, Antwerp, Belgium
 Rádio Energia 97 FM, São Paulo, Brazil
 Alpha Radio, Warna, Bulgaria
 ICRT, Taipei, Taiwan
 Kick FM, Gelsenkirchen, Germany
 sunshine live, Mannheim, Germany
 DJ FM, Toronto, Canada
 Dix FM, Bogotá, Colombia
 Slam!FM, Hilversum, Netherlands
 Radio 538, Hilversum, Netherlands
 Dolfijn FM, Willemstad, Aruba
 UP FM, Manukau City, New Zealand
 Mega Hits, Lisbon, Portugal
 Радио Рекорд, St. Petersburg, Russia
 Radio Ambrosio, Lineares, Chile
 Radio One Mallorca, Palma de Mallorca, Spain
 Kiss 91.75 FM, Pattaya, Thailand
 Mix FM, Beirut, Lebanon
 Indigo 91.9 FM, Bangalore, India
 Alfa Radio 104.1, Guayaquil, Ecuador
 Hitz FM, Malaysia
 Reef FM, Tenerife
 BPM Channel 51, Sirius XM
 1Mix online radio, Isle of Man
 106.1 Geronimo, Indonesia
 CRI Hit FM, China (Beijing, Shanghai and Guangzhou)
 Radio La Marka 90.9 FM, Nicaragua
 Freakhouse on Air, South Korea
 Fame 95 FM (InDaHouse Radio), Jamaica
 More 94FM (InDaHouse Radio), Bahamas
 Radio1 FM88, Rhodes, Greece
 Hit Radio Network, Morocco/central Africa
 MB Music Radio, Constanța, Romania
 101.5 Volgograd FM, Oblast, Volgograd, Russia
 105.7 Metro, Queensland, Australia
 Radio WOW (Superstar DJ Show), Friuli Venezia Giulia, Italy
 Rouge FM (Rouge Platine), Lausanne, Switzerland
 90.3 Delta FM, Buenos Aires
 Kiss FM Australia
 Radio NRJ , France/Finland/Germany/Austria/Cyprus
 TopRadio, Flemish Belgium
 Europa FM, Spain, Canary Islands, & Ibiza
 EnterZagreb.HR, Croatia
 Capital Radio 93.8, Cyprus
 Future Groove Online Radio, Tokyo
 Deejay FM, Tegucigalpa, Honduras
 Beat 100.9, Mexico City
 104.3 Kick FM, Puebla, Mexico
 Kiss FM Ukraine
 88 FM City Radio, Tirana, Albania
 RadioEX Online Radio, Kiev, Ukraine
 Radio Delirio, Tacuarembo, Uruguay
 Radio Electro Vibe (Online), Oscasco, Brazil
 Big Radio 3, Bosnia
 Freeminded Online Radio, Amsterdam
 DDM Online Radio, Ireland
 Fuzed Club Radio San Juan, Puerto Rico
 Radio Hits 88.2, Cairo
 Ultrastacion Radio Venezuela
 Infinite Radio, Santa Barbara, Honduras
 Radio One 103.9, Curacao
 Unika FM, Madrid
 Hits 1 Online, Toulouse, France
 Hot Hits Online, UK
 Radio 538, Colombia
 Radio Nova, Bulgaria
 95.7 Radyo S, Bursa, Turkey
 104.2 Warm FM, Liège, Belgium
 Trendy FM, Limburg (Belgium)
 Big City Beats, Germany
 Radio Morabeza, Cape Verde
 Radio-Smash, Tunisia
 My 95.9, Honolulu, USA
 Sonic.FM, Argentina
 Lumix FM, Moscow
 Radio Utopia, Lagos, Portugal
 DJ Frenzy Online, Ontario, Canada
 Block FM, Japan
FutureGroove FM, Tokyo

Awards and nominations

References

External links 
 Official Website

2011 radio programme debuts
Dutch music radio programs
Electronic music radio shows
Sirius XM Radio programs